Watson Shields Dolliver (September 26, 1863June 25, 1921) was a 19th-century American Boston maritime pilot. He served for over 25 years as a Boston pilot. Dolliver was owner of the pilot boat Louise and was pilot on the Liberty. He died on June 25, 1921, in Cambridge, Massachusetts.

Early life

Watson S. Dolliver was born in Newton, Massachusetts on September 26, 1863. He was a second generation of pilots, the son of Pilot  James M. Dolliver and Mary A. Longhurst. He had two uncles who were also pilots. He had two wives, Catharine E. Ford and Ella A. Candage.

His father served on the pilot boat Friend. On February 2, 1859, his father and Patrick Henry Chandler rescued the captain of the British schooner Caroline that went ashore on the rocks near the Boston Light in heavy weather while approaching Boston. They received a silver medal from the Massachusetts Humane Society for their brave efforts.

Career

Dolliver followed his father in the pilot business. He first went to sea in a training ship USS Portsmouth, a Sloop-of-war run as a school by the United States Navy. He was an apprentice on the  Eben D. Jordan in 1890. He received his full pilots' commission on March 10, 1896. He followed his father in the pilot service. He was skilled with vessels, being able to navigate them in and out of the Boston Harbor.

Dolliver was a pilot on the pilot-boat Minerva when she took her trial trip on March 14, 1896 from the National dock at East Boston. The rest of the crew consisted of Captain Franklin B. Wellock, with pilots McField and Bruce B. McLean.

Dolliver served for more than 25 years as a Boston pilot and was as one of the best known pilots in New England. In 1916 he became an executive legislative agent at the Boston Pilots' office at Lewis Wharf in Boston for the Pilots' Association.

Louise

Dolliver was owner and pilot on the Louise, No. 2. On October 17, 1900, while on the Louise, he boarded the Cunard Line steamship Saxonia, with two pilots. On return to the pilot boat, Erick Ahlquist and William Weaver almost drowned when a wave filled the yawl with water and overturned it. The steamer was able to rescue the men and take them aboard the Saxonia. 

Dolliver was at the funeral of two of his fellow pilots. On April 29, 1902, he went to the funeral of his friend Captain Franklin Fowler where the ashes were thrown off the deck into Massachusetts Bay, from the Boston pilot-boat America, No. 1. On October 5, 1906, Dolliver went to the funeral for his friend Captain James L. Smith. There was an escort of 20 pilots that followed the casket from the chapel to the cemetery.

On October 8, 1906, Dolliver was on the Louise when he picked up two escaped prisoners from Deer Island Prison, during a storm, in a raft near Graves Lightship.

On March 1, 1911, the Louise crashed into the British tramp steamship Pinar del Rio, in bad weather near the  Boston Lightship channel. The Louise was trying to take off a pilot from the steamer when the crash occurred. The crew was transferred to the pilot boat Adams, No. 5.

On October 8, 1916, Dolliver on the pilot boat Liberty, helped The Boston Globe when he transferred a reporter to the pilot boat Louise when they reached Boston's outer station. The reporter and the Pilot McMilian were able to board the American-Hawaiian Steamship Company steamer SS Kansan that was headed for Boston with news about the  German U-53 U-boat. The Globe had the story out in the morning papers before anyone else.

Death

Captain Dolliver died, at age 57, while on duty at the Boston Harbor pilots' office on June 25, 1921 in Cambridge, Massachusetts. The funeral services were conducted by Rev. William E. Huntington at the Mount Auburn Chapel. He was buried at the Mount Auburn Cemetery in Massachusetts. At his death, the flag at the Lewis Wharf office was placed at half-staff. Funeral services were held at the chapel in Mount Auburn Cemetery. The funeral was attended by the pilot commissioners and the Boston pilots, including James H. Reid and John Henry Low.

See also
 List of Northeastern U. S. Pilot Boats

References

1921 deaths
People from Massachusetts
Maritime pilotage
1863 births
Sea captains